Corinna Schumacher (née Betsch; born 2 March 1969) is a German animal rights activist and accomplished horse rider. She is married to German former racing driver Michael Schumacher.

Personal life
A keen horsewoman, in 2010 Schumacher won the European Championship in western style horse riding. Corinna is also an avid dog lover and a dedicated animal rights activist. In 1997, she gave birth to a daughter, Gina-Maria, who is a non-professional horse rider, and in 1999, a son Mick, who is now a professional racing driver, who has competed in Formula One following the footsteps of his father and uncle.

She is the wife of German seven-time Formula One champion Michael Schumacher, and sister-in-law to former Formula One driver Ralf Schumacher. Corinna and Michael were married in Germany in August 1995. Before she married Michael, she was in a relationship with Heinz-Harald Frentzen in the early 1990s. 

Corinna and Michael own horse ranches in Texas and Switzerland. The CS Ranch, located in Gordonville, Texas, deals in all aspects of the reining industry, focusing mainly on training and showing. CS Ranch accepts a select number of outside horses into their training program.

References

1969 births
Living people
People from Märkischer Kreis
Racing drivers' wives and girlfriends
Corinna